PRAS or Pras may refer to:

People
Pras (born 1972), American rapper and member of The Fugees
Éric Pras (born 1972), French chef
Jacques Pras (1924–1982), French cyclist

Other uses
Polynomial-time randomized approximation scheme, in computer science
Pras (Thessaly), a town of Phthiotis in ancient Thessaly

See also
PRA (disambiguation)